Best Unlimited is a greatest hits compilation from 2 Unlimited, a Eurodance project founded in 1991 by Belgian producers Jean-Paul DeCoster and Phil Wilde and fronted by Dutch rapper Ray Slijngaard and Dutch vocalist Anita Doth. The record was released on September 30, 1998 via Mercury Records.

Release History
Best Unlimited was released in 1998 through record label Mercury Records in Japan.

Track listing
 "Wanna Get Up" – 3:15
 "No Limit" – 3:30
 "Get Ready For This" – 3:42
 "Let The Beat Control Your Body" – 3:38
 "The Edge of Heaven" – 4:14
 "Jump For Joy" – 3:42
 "Closer 2 U" – 5:14
 "Back Into The Groove" – 4:00
 "Workaholic" – 3:35
 "Never Surrender" – 3:55
 "Tribal Dance" – 3:41
 "Twilight Zone" – 4:10
 "The Real Thing" – 3:40
 "Wanna Get Up" (Sash! Radio Edit) – 3:16
 "The Edge Of Heaven" (Sharp Funky Driver Remix) - 8:57
 "II Unlimited Megamix" - 3:47

Charts

 Japan: #85

References

2 Unlimited albums
1998 albums